Halsteren is a town in the Dutch province of North Brabant. It is located in the municipality of Bergen op Zoom, about 1 km north of that city. Halsteren has an old church from the 14th century and a new church, built in 1919. A little village called Polder was located between Halsteren and Tholen in the Middle Ages.

History 
The village was first mentioned in 1272 as Halst[ert, and means "bend in the highland with a tail". It developed on a westward pointing sandy ridge.

The Dutch Reformed church was built in the 14th century. It was extended in 1457. After a fire in 1607, it was extensively restored. In 1799, it was returned to the Catholic church and restored several times. In 1961, it became a Dutch Reformed church again. The Catholic  St. Quirinus Church was built between 1911 and 1912 and has a double tower. The former town hall dates from 1633. It was restored and extended in 1917. It was restored in 1944 after a fire.

Halsteren was home to 538 people in 1840. Halsteren was a separate municipality until 1997, when it became a part of Bergen op Zoom.

The village of Polder or Polre was located near Halsteren. It disappeared in a flood in 1570 and most of the village is still buried underneath a metre of mud.

Gallery

References

External links

Information about Halsteren on the site of the BHIC (Dutch)

Municipalities of the Netherlands disestablished in 1997
Populated places in North Brabant
Former municipalities of North Brabant
Bergen op Zoom